Sir John Molesworth, 4th Baronet  (1705–1766) of Pencarrow, Cornwall, was a British landowner and Tory politician who sat in the House of Commons between 1734 and 1761. 

Molesworth was baptized on 28 February 1705, the eldest of Sir John Molesworth, 3rd Baronet, and his wife  Jane Arscott daughter of  John Arscott of Tetcott, Devon. In  June 1723, he succeeded to the baronetcy and Pencarrow, on the death of his father. He married Barbara Morice, daughter of Sir Nicholas Morice, 2nd Baronet in 1728.
 
At the 1734 British general election Molesworth was returned unopposed as a Tory Member of Parliament for Newport on the interest of his brother-in-law, Sir William Morice. He did not stand at the  1741 British general election  but was returned  as MP for Cornwall at a by-election on 12 December 1744 in succession to his wife's brother-in-law, Sir John St Aubyn, 3rd Baronet. He was returned unopposed again at the   1747 British general election. He voted consistently against the Governments of Walpole and Pelham.

Molesworth was alarmed at the threat of a contest at the  1754 British general election but it did not materialize and he was returned unopposed. However he declined the prospect of a contest at the 1761 British general election.

Molesworth started the construction of Pencarrow in the 1760s, extending a large older house on the site. He died on 4 April 1766, leaving two sons and a daughter. He was succeeded in the baronetcy by his son John who completed the house at Pencarrow.

References

 

1705 births
1766 deaths
British MPs 1734–1741
British MPs 1741–1747
British MPs 1747–1754
British MPs 1754–1761
Members of the Parliament of Great Britain for English constituencies
Baronets in the Baronetage of England
Members of the Parliament of Great Britain for Newport (Cornwall)